Sainte-Dorothée was a commuter rail station operated by the Réseau de transport métropolitain (RTM) in Laval, Quebec, Canada. 

It is a future Réseau express métropolitain station.

Origin of name
Sainte-Dorothée takes its name from the Sainte-Dorothée district of Laval, Quebec.

Between 1993 and 1995, prior to the modernization of the Deux-Montagnes Line, there were three stations served now by Sainte-Dorothée, from north to south: Laval-sur-le-Lac, Laval-Links, and Sainte-Dorothée.  There were plans to amalgamate Île-Bigras into this station as well, but plans were shelved after an outcry from residents of Île-Bigras.

Location
The station is located at 1411 chemin du Bord-de-l'Eau at rue Gobeil, in Laval. It is easily accessible from Autoroute 440 which, west of Autoroute 13, becomes Avenue des Bois.

Future projects
Upon completion of the Réseau express métropolitain, this station is expected to be upgraded to rapid transit standards and integrated into the new network.

Connecting bus routes

Société de transport de Laval

References

External links
 Sainte-Dorothée Commuter Train Station Information (RTM)
 Sainte-Dorothée Commuter Train Station Schedule (RTM)
 STL 2011 map

Former Exo commuter rail stations
Railway stations in Laval, Quebec
Réseau express métropolitain railway stations